HM Prison Wormwood Scrubs (nicknamed "The Scrubs") is a Category B men's local prison, located beside Hammersmith Hospital and W12 Conferences on Du Cane Road in the White City in West London, England. The prison is operated by His Majesty's Prison Service.

History
The prison lies at the southern end of the ancient park of the same name. The name "Scrubs" refers to scrubland while Wormwood — Artemisia absinthium — is a grey-foliaged sub-shrub, common on wasteland, which was traditionally used as a herb for the treatment of parasitic worms.

19th century
The initial steps in the winter of 1874 involved the construction of a small prison made of corrugated iron and a temporary shed to serve as a barracks for the warders. Nine specially picked prisoners, all within a year of release, completed the buildings, after which 50 more prisoners were brought to erect a second temporary prison wing. Building then began on the permanent prison, with bricks being manufactured on site.

By the summer of 1875, enough bricks had been prepared to build the prison's first block and its ground floor was finished as winter began. Construction was completed in 1891. The designer was Sir Edmund Frederick Du Cane, who gave his name to the prison's road.

The First World War

The prison housed a number of conscientious objectors in the First World War, one of whom, the Quaker journalist Hubert W. Peet, wrote about the conditions there in 112 Days' Hard Labour (1917).

The Second World War
During the Second World War, the prison was taken over by the War Department and the prisoners were evacuated to other prisons. The Security Service (MI5) was based at Wormwood Scrubs from 1939 to 1940.

Modern era
In 1979, IRA prisoners staged a rooftop protest over visiting rights. Sixty inmates and several prison officers were injured. In 1982, an inquiry blamed much of the difficulties on failings in prison management. The Governor, John McCarthy, had quit before the rioting. In a letter to The Times, he had described Wormwood Scrubs as a "penal dustbin".

In the 1990s, a police investigation into allegations of staff brutality resulted in the suspension of 27 prison officers and the conviction of six for assault, though three later won appeals against conviction. The Prison Service paid out more than three million pounds in out-of-court settlements with ex-prisoners who had alleged brutality. The Chief Inspector of Prisons delivered a damning report on the conditions, in which the prison was told to improve or close.

In March 2004, a further report from the Chief inspector stated that Wormwood Scrubs had greatly improved after making fundamental changes. Three quarters of inmates at the prison had said that staff treated them with respect, which was better than the national average. However, the report also stated that inmates spent too much time in their cells, and that only 36 per cent of eligible inmates were involved in education or work.

In November 2008, another report from the Chief Inspector stated that conditions at Wormwood Scrubs had deteriorated since the last inspection. Heightened prison gang activity had been detected, and 20 per cent of prisoners had failed drugs tests.

The prison cell blocks are Grade II listed, with the gatehouse given the higher Grade II* rating.

Major structural changes to the prison's management took place in 2013.  In 2014, another report by the Inspectorate of Prisons was critical of the prison, describing it as "filthy". The inspectors also stated that there had been a failure to put into place recommendations by the Prisons and Probation Ombudsman to deal with suicide and self-harm.  The Chief Executive of the Howard League for Penal Reform, a charitable body, said "I have never seen a public service deteriorate so rapidly and so profoundly."

In 2017, the prison was reportedly overcrowded and some areas were strewn with litter and infested with rats and cockroaches. At the time of the inspection, there were 1,258 prisoners. Some were locked in their cells for 23 hours a day. The prison was reportedly dangerous for staff and inmates, and officers were concerned for their safety. There were 40 to 50 violent incidents a month. Chief Inspector Peter Clarke described “an extremely concerning picture” including, "intractable failings" continuing since earlier inspections from 2014.

In 2018, a prisoner was stabbed to death and three other prisoners were charged with his murder.
On August 30, 2018, prisoner Winston Augustine committed suicide in the segregation unit after spending two days locked in a showerless cell with no food and without the tramadol prescribed for kidney stones that caused him pain. He was suffering from ketoacidosis due to starvation. A 2021 inquest subsequently identified the prison's failure to provide food and medication as contributing factors to the death; the facility's head of safer custody told the inquest she was "horrified" by the "wrongdoing".

In 2019, HM Inspectorate of Prisons found that although improvements had been made to make the prison safer, "the work was often not sufficiently embedded to have yet made enough difference to outcomes". Another inspection in 2021 reported that improvements had been maintained and there were reductions in the level of violence, though this was partly because many prisoners were locked in their cells for most of the day. At the time of the inspection there were 1,079 prisoners.

The prison today

Wormwood Scrubs is a Category B prison for adult males, sentenced or on remand from the local courts. The prison has five main wings and a number of smaller dedicated units. All accommodation includes electricity, integral sanitation, a TV, and accompanying bedroom furniture:

 A wing – remand and sentenced prisoners 
 B wing – induction wing  
 C wing – remand and sentenced prisoners
 D wing – remand and sentenced prisoners and high risk prisoner requiring single cells 
 E wing – remand and sentenced prisoners 
 Super enhanced wing – enhanced prisoners who are considered to be trustworthy 
 Conibeere Unit – prisoners who require a substance misuse stabilisation regime
 First Night Centre – for prisoners during their first day(s) in custody

There is a contracted prison shop previously run by Aramark, but now run by DHL Supply Chain, which provides a selection of consumables for purchase by prisoners.

The two oval plaster reliefs on the front of the prison depict Elizabeth Fry and John Howard, both well known figures in prison reform.

Notable inmates

 Paul Blackburn
 George Blake
 Reginald Horace Blyth
 Horatio Bottomley
 Ian Brady
 Charles Bronson
 Basil Bunting
 Morris Cohen (alias Peter Kroger)
 Fred Copeman
 Peter Samuel Cook aka The Cambridge Rapist
 Pete Doherty
 Lord Alfred Douglas
 Leslie Grantham
 John Hampson
 Nicholas van Hoogstraten
 John Hopkins
 Thomas Jones, Baron Maelor
 Mike Lesser
 Saunders Lewis
 Konon Molody (alias Gordon Lonsdale)
 Dennis Nilsen
 Mark Morrison
 Timmy Murphy
 Lord William Beauchamp Nevill.
 Joseph Pearce
 Owen Philipps, 1st Baron Kylsant
 Count Geoffrey Potocki de Montalk
 Keith Richards
 Nikos Sampson
 Richard Starkie
 John Stonehouse
 Murdoc Niccals
 Michael Tippett
 Nines (rapper)
 Lewis Valentine
 David John Williams
 Koci Selamaj

In popular culture

Literature
 Death of a Train (1946) An Inspector French Mystery by Freeman Wills Crofts
 "The Kite" (1946), short story by W. Somerset Maugham published in The Strand Magazine
 "Episode" (1947), short story by W. Somerset Maugham published in Good Housekeeping
 One of the main characters in Sarah Waters's novel "The Night Watch" (2006) served his sentence at the Scrubs.
 Peter Wildeblood was imprisoned in the Scrubs in 1954. His book "Against the Law", describes his trial and imprisonment.
 The prison is mentioned in the Russian novel Figurehead, by Danil Koretsky (Данил Корецкий, Подставная фигура). The parents of the principal character are held in the Scrubs and are unsuccessfully sought-out by the Russian SVR.
 Bunny Manders, the narrator of the A. J. Raffles stories by E. W. Hornung, serves his sentence at Wormwood Scrubs.
 Julet Armstrong, protagonist of the 2018 Kate Atkinson World War II novel Transcription, works for MI5 for a time in the Scrubs.
This prison is also mentioned in the book "Stay where you are and then leave", by Irish writer John Boyne, as the place where character Joe Patience stayed for almost two years while refusing to be a soldier in the first world war (chapter 6).
 The autobiography 'Psychic Screw' of former Prison Officer John G. Sutton details events at the prison including the specifics concerning the rooftop protest by the IRA. Sutton served as an Officer at the jail from 1975 to late 1976.

Film and television
In films and TV programmes set in Britain the front entrance of Wormwood Scrubs is frequently chosen as a location for scenes showing a character being released from prison, as, for example, in:
Billy Liar
The Man In Possession
The Spy Who Came in from the Cold
The Horse's Mouth
Hot Millions
Frenzy
A Very British Coup
Cass
The Sweeney – "One of Your Own"
The Italian Job
The Baron – "Something for a Rainy Day"
Minder, in the episodes "Bury My Half at Waltham Green" and "The Birdman of Wormwood Scrubs"; Terry McCann, the titular minder, also served his time in the Scrubs before the series began and the front of the prison can be seen in the opening credits.
Danger Man – in the episode "Such Men Are Dangerous" John Drake (played by Patrick McGoohan) is substituted for a man being released and is shown leaving the Scrubs.
Steptoe and Son
Rumpole of the Bailey series 2 "Rumpole and the Age for Retirement" 1979
The Slammer used the prison doors to show winners of the Freedom Show being released.

A two-part documentary, Wormwood Scrubs, was shown on ITV1 in May 2010.

Music
 Gary Moore is shown being escorted out of the prison entrance by a guard on the cover of his 1978 album Back on the Streets.
 The prison is mentioned in The Jam's song "Down in the Tube Station at Midnight" and in Billy Bragg's "Rotting on Remand" from the Workers Playtime album. 
 The Pete Doherty song "Broken Love Song" is about the singer's tenure in the prison in early 2008.
 Spike Milligan recorded "The Wormwood Scrubs Tango" about an elderly car thief in the prison.
 In 2018, Murdoc Niccals, fictional bassist for the virtual band Gorillaz, was sent to the prison in the story surrounding the album The Now Now.
 The Lucksmiths' "Train Robbers' Wives" opening verse is about a Scrubs inmate being visited by his wife.

References

External links 

 
Victorian London – prisons and penal system
George Blake escape
BBC News – Troubled history of the Scrubs
Amnesty International – Public statement on Wormwood Scrubs
The Home Office – HMP Wormwood Scrubs – Significant improvements under pressure

Government buildings completed in 1891
Infrastructure completed in 1891
Wormwood Scrubs
Wormwood
Grade II listed buildings in the London Borough of Hammersmith and Fulham
White City
Grade II listed prison buildings
1874 establishments in England
Wormwood Scrubs
World War II prisoner of war camps in England